Leif Juster (born Leif Normann Nilsen) (14 February 1910 – 25 November 1995) was a Norwegian comedian, singer and actor, arguably the most popular of his generation in Norway. Juster started out as a variety show performer, and for a period he ran the theater Edderkoppen. Characterised by his unusually tall, lanky figure and squeeky voice, his signature act was the monologue "Mot normalt". He also acted in several successful comedies on the big screen, notably Den forsvundne pølsemaker (1941), Det æ'kke te å tru (1942), En herre med bart (1942) and Fjols til fjells (1957).

He was the uncle of another of Norway's most beloved comedians, the late Rolf Just Nilsen.

References

External links

Biography.

1910 births
1995 deaths
Norwegian male comedians
Norwegian male stage actors
Norwegian male film actors
Leonard Statuette winners
20th-century Norwegian male actors
20th-century Norwegian male singers
20th-century Norwegian singers
20th-century comedians